Midian is the fourth studio album by English extreme metal band Cradle of Filth. It was released on 30 October 2000, through Music for Nations. The album marks the return of guitarist Paul Allender to the band, as well as the introduction of drummer Adrian Erlandsson (At the Gates, The Haunted) and keyboard player Martin Powell (My Dying Bride, Anathema). It also features Doug Bradley (Hellraiser, Hellbound) as the narrator for various songs.

Thematic inspiration
Midian is inspired by English author Clive Barker's novel Cabal and his subsequent film version Nightbreed. Dani Filth explained to the magazine Empire in September 2012:

We loved Cabal, The Damnation Game and The Books of Blood, and we liked that everything had "Clive Barker presents..." on it before people even knew who he was. That gave it an air of mystery: you should know who this is, but you don't. Midian kind of is and isn't a concept album: as a title, it just made perfect sense. The central song, "Tortured Soul Asylum", is about Midian, and the characters in the rest [of the album] made up a sort of collective from this mythical place where the monsters live.

Doug Bradley, who played the role of Lylesberg in Nightbreed (but is better known as Pinhead from Barker's Hellraiser and its sequels), provides narration on some tracks.

In the Bible, the "Midianites" are an Arab tribe descended from Abraham, and Midian itself is where Moses spent his forty-year exile from Egypt. The biblical Midianites take their name from Midian, a son of Abraham, and one of his concubines. Today, the former territory of Midian is found through small portions of western Saudi Arabia, southern Jordan, southern Israel and the Sinai. The people of Midian are also mentioned extensively in the Qur'an, where the name appears in Arabic as Madyan. The Midian of Cabal and Nightbreed is a hidden city west of Calgary in Alberta, Canada, offering shelter for monsters away from humanity.

The song "Cthulhu Dawn" invokes the character from horror writer H. P. Lovecraft's Cthulhu Mythos.

The opening line of "Lord Abortion" ("Care for a little necrophilia?") is a quote from Terry Gilliam's film Brazil (voiced by Kim Greist in the film, but delivered here by Toni King, frontman Dani Filth's wife).

Release 

Midian was released on 30 October 2000 by record label Music for Nations. It reached  number 63 in the UK Albums Chart. The cover was by the artist J.K. Potter. It was subsequently also used as the jacket for Potter's 2002 horror fiction anthology Embrace the Mutation.

"Her Ghost in the Fog" spawned a music video, which received heavy rotation on MTV2 and other rock channels, and was directed by Alex Chandon (who also directed the 2001 horror film Cradle of Fear in which Dani Filth appeared). "Her Ghost in the Fog" appeared on the soundtrack for Ginger Snaps in 2000 and in the video game Brütal Legend in 2009.

The album was reissued in 2012 by The End.

Critical reception 

NME called it "one of the most ludicrous records you'll ever hear", though their review was favourable. In 2020, it was named one of the 20 best metal albums of 2000 by Metal Hammer magazine.

Track listing

Personnel 

 Cradle of Filth
 Dani Filth – lead vocals
 Paul Allender – lead guitar
 Gian Pyres – rhythm guitar
 Robin Graves – bass
 Martin Powell – keyboards
 Adrian Erlandsson – drums
 Sarah Jezebel Deva – backing vocals

 Guest/session musicians
 Martin Walkyier – vocals on "For Those Who Died"
 Mika Lindberg – backing vocals
 Doug Bradley – narration on "Death Magick for Adepts", "Her Ghost in the Fog" and "Tortured Soul Asylum"
 Toni King – voice on "Lord Abortion"
 Andy Nice – cello

 Production
John Fryer – producer, engineer, mixing
Doug Cook – engineer, mixing
Jamie Morrison – assistant engineer
Ray Staff – mastering

Charts

References

External links
 
JK Potter art

Cradle of Filth albums
2000 albums
Concept albums
Cthulhu Mythos music
Music for Nations albums
E1 Music albums